The 6th Infantry Brigade (Lebanon) is a Lebanese Army unit that fought in the Lebanese Civil War, being active since its creation in January 1983.

Origins
In the aftermath of the June–September 1982 Israeli invasion of Lebanon, President Amin Gemayel, convinced that a strong and unified national defense force was a prerequisite to rebuilding the nation, announced plans to raise a 60,000-man army organized into twelve brigades (created from existing infantry regiments), trained and equipped by France and the United States. In late 1982, the 6th Infantry Regiment was therefore re-organized and expanded to a brigade group numbering 1,600–2,000 men, mostly Shia Muslims, though this total originally also included a number of Maronite Christians, which became on January 18, 1983, the 6th Defence Brigade (Arabic: لواء الدفاع السادس | Liwa' al-Difa'a al-Sa'adis), later changed on February 6, 1983, to 6th Infantry Brigade.

Emblem
The Brigade's emblem is composed of a two-color background setting, blue on top and red below. A charging golden ram head with a fire tail prodding from the neck is set at the middle, symbolizing the will to attack and assail with determination and resolution; a golden Arabic numeral (6) inserted on a white ring is placed below.

Structure and organization
The new unit grew from an understrength battalion comprising three rifle companies to a fully equipped mechanized infantry brigade, capable of aligning a Headquarters' (HQ) battalion, an armoured battalion (64th) equipped with Alvis Saladin armoured cars, AMX-13 light tanks, M48A5 main battle tanks, three mechanized infantry battalions (61st, 62nd and 63rd) issued with M113, Alvis Saracen and VAB armored personnel carriers (APC), plus an artillery battalion (65th) fielding US M114 155 mm howitzers. The Brigade also fielded a logistics battalion, equipped with US M151A2 jeeps, Land-Rover long wheelbase series III, Chevrolet C20 and Dodge Ram (1st generation) pickups and US M35A2 2½-ton military trucks. Later in the war, the brigade received from Syria a consignment of 30 or 50 Soviet T-55A main battle tanks (which replaced in the late 1980s the Brigade's own AMX-13 light tanks) and a number of Chinese Type 63 107mm multiple rocket launchers.

Headquartered at the Henri Chihab Barracks at Jnah, in the south-western Chyah suburb of West Beirut, the formation was subsequently enlarged to 6,000 men by absorbing Shia deserters from other Army units – which included the 97th Battalion from the Seventh Brigade – after they went over to their coreligionists of the Amal Movement following the collapse of the government forces in February 1984. Thus by 1985 the reinforced Brigade, now under the operational control of the Amal militia, aligned a tank battalion, three to four mechanized infantry battalions on tracked and wheeled APCs, and an artillery battalion.

Combat history

The Lebanese Civil War
Between 2 and 15 October 1982, while was still being formed, the new 6th Defence Brigade under the command of Colonel Michel Aoun re-entered West Beirut alongside other Lebanese Army units and the Internal Security Forces (ISF), ostensibly to carry out the pacification of the Muslim-populated districts of the Capital city.  Acting in collusion with the Christian Lebanese Forces militia, they arrested 1,441 Muslims (other sources indicate a higher number, some 2,000) who were either members or supporters of Leftist political groups and subsequently disappeared; none was heard of again.

Commanded by the Christian Colonel Lufti Jabar, who was formerly attached to the Syrian-dominated Arab Deterrent Force, the Sixth Brigade's primary mission during the Mountain War had been to maintain order and security in West Beirut. After the Brigade split off from the Army command structure on February 6, 1984, it was taken over by a new officer, the Shi'ite Colonel (later, Major general) Abd al-Halim Kanj; those Christian officers and enlisted men who remained loyal to the Lebanese Government left the Brigade and were evacuated under Amal fighters' escort to East Beirut, where they enrolled in other Christian-controlled Army units. On July 24, 1984, the Sixth Brigade intervened to curb fighting in West Beirut between the Sunni Al-Mourabitoun and Druze People's Liberation Army (PLA) militias.
 
During the War of the Camps in May 1985, the Sixth Brigade supported the Amal militia against the pro-Arafat Palestinian camp militias in the battle for the control of the Sabra and Shatila and Bourj el-Barajneh refugee camps in West Beirut.
However, it refused to participate in the February 1986 clashes between the Amal militia and the Lebanese Army, and as a result, the Fifth Brigade was expelled from West Beirut. In 1987 the Sixth brigade deserted again to join their coreligionists.

The post-civil war years 1990-present
Upon the end of the war in October 1990, the Sixth Brigade was re-integrated into the structure of the Lebanese Armed Forces (LAF), with the 97th Battalion being returned to the Seventh Brigade.

See also
 Amal Movement
 Lebanese Armed Forces
 Lebanese Civil War
 Lebanese Forces
 List of weapons of the Lebanese Civil War
 Mountain War (Lebanon)
 Progressive Socialist Party
 People's Liberation Army (Lebanon)
 1st Infantry Brigade (Lebanon)
 2nd Infantry Brigade (Lebanon)
 3rd Infantry Brigade (Lebanon)
 4th Infantry Brigade (Lebanon)
 5th Infantry Brigade (Lebanon)
 7th Infantry Brigade (Lebanon)
 8th Infantry Brigade (Lebanon)
 9th Infantry Brigade (Lebanon)
 10th Infantry Brigade (Lebanon)
 11th Infantry Brigade (Lebanon)
 12th Infantry Brigade (Lebanon)

Notes

References

 Aram Nerguizian, Anthony H. Cordesman & Arleigh A. Burke, The Lebanese Armed Forces: Challenges and Opportunities in Post-Syria Lebanon, Burke Chair in Strategy, Center for Strategic & International Studies (CSIS), First Working Draft: February 10, 2009. – 
Are J. Knudsen, Lebanese Armed Forces: A United Army for a Divided Country?, CMI INSIGHT, November 2014 No 9, Chr. Michelsen Institute (CMI), Bergen - Norway. – 
 Denise Ammoun, Histoire du Liban contemporain: Tome 2 1943-1990, Éditions Fayard, Paris 2005.  (in French) – 
 Edgar O'Ballance, Civil War in Lebanon 1975-92, Palgrave Macmillan, London 1998. 
 Éric Micheletti and Yves Debay, Liban – dix jours aux cœur des combats, RAIDS magazine n.º41, October 1989 issue.  (in French)
James Kinnear, Stephen Sewell & Andrey Aksenov, Soviet T-54 Main Battle Tank, General Military series, Osprey Publishing Ltd, Oxford 2018. 
James Kinnear, Stephen Sewell & Andrey Aksenov, Soviet T-55 Main Battle Tank, General Military series, Osprey Publishing Ltd, Oxford 2019. 
Joseph Hokayem, L'armée libanaise pendant la guerre: un instrument du pouvoir du président de la République (1975-1985), Lulu.com, Beyrouth 2012. , 1291036601 (in French) – 
 Ken Guest, Lebanon, in Flashpoint! At the Front Line of Today’s Wars, Arms and Armour Press, London 1994, pp. 97–111.  
 Matthew S. Gordon, The Gemayels (World Leaders Past & Present), Chelsea House Publishers, 1988. 
 Moustafa El-Assad, Landing Zone Lebanon – UNIFIL 2006, Blue Steel Info, Beirut 2007. 
 Moustafa El-Assad, Civil Wars Volume 1: The Gun Trucks, Blue Steel books, Sidon 2008. 
 Oren Barak, The Lebanese Army – A National institution in a divided society, State University of New York Press, Albany 2009.  – 
 Rex Brynen, Sanctuary and Survival: the PLO in Lebanon, Boulder: Westview Press, Oxford 1990.  – 
Robert Fisk, Pity the Nation: Lebanon at War, London: Oxford University Press, (3rd ed. 2001).  – 
 Samer Kassis, 30 Years of Military Vehicles in Lebanon, Beirut: Elite Group, 2003. 
 Samer Kassis, Véhicules Militaires au Liban/Military Vehicles in Lebanon 1975-1981, Trebia Publishing, Chyah 2012. 
 Samuel M. Katz, Lee E. Russel, and Ron Volstad, Armies in Lebanon 1982-84, Men-at-Arms series 165, Osprey Publishing Ltd, London 1985. 
 Samuel M. Katz and Ron Volstad, Arab Armies of the Middle East wars 2, Men-at-Arms series 194, Osprey Publishing Ltd, London 1988.  
 Steven J. Zaloga, Tank battles of the Mid-East Wars (2): The wars of 1973 to the present, Concord Publications, Hong Kong 2003.  –  
 Thomas Collelo (ed.), Lebanon: a country study, Library of Congress, Federal Research Division, Headquarters, Department of the Army (DA Pam 550-24), Washington D.C., December 1987 (Third edition 1989). – 
 Yann Mahé, La Guerre Civile Libanaise, un chaos indescriptible (1975-1990), Trucks & Tanks Magazine n.º 41, January–February 2014, pp. 78–81.  (in French)
Zachary Sex & Bassel Abi-Chahine, Modern Conflicts 2 – The Lebanese Civil War, From 1975 to 1991 and Beyond, Modern Conflicts Profile Guide Volume II, AK Interactive, 2021. ISBN 8435568306073

External links
Histoire militaire de l'armée libanaise de 1975 à 1990 (in French)
Lebanese Armed Forces (LAF) Official Website
Lebanon Military Guide from GlobalSecurity.org
CIA - The World Factbook - Lebanon
Global Fire Power - Lebanon Military Strength
Lebanon army trying to rearm and modernize itself
Lebanese Military Wish List 2008/2009 - New York Times

Military units and formations of Lebanon
Military units and formations established in 1983
1983 establishments in Lebanon

bn:লেবাননের সামরিক বাহিনী
fr:Armée libanaise